This is a list of films produced by the Bollywood film industry based in Mumbai in 2008.

Highest-grossing films

List of released films

January–March

April–June

July–September

October–December

Notes

External links 
 Bollywood films of 2008 at the Internet Movie Database

2008
Lists of 2008 films by country or language
2008 in Indian cinema